Doo Daruwo (Sinhala, "children") was one of the longest running Sri Lankan television serials, airing from 1990 to 1995. It was one of the most popular shows of its time and drew in 8 million viewers at its peak.

Plot 
This was a story that revolved around a family; how a family starts, grows rich by indulging in all types of vices and more importantly, how it changes over generations while infusing different social morals into it.

Cast and crew

Cast 

Henry Jayasena – Sudu Seeya
Iranganie Serasinghe - Dulsey Aachchi
H.A. Perera - Dias
Sunethra Saratchandra - Kusumalatha
Neil Alas - Sumanadasa
Veena Jayakody - Sudharma
Jayalath Manoratne - Punsiri
Chandani Seneviratne - Nandani
Nilmini Tennakoon – Deepthi
Udeni Alwis - Sampath
Ajith Lokuge
Yashoda Wimaladharma – Priyanvada
Kelum Wijesuriya
Deepani Silva - Gnawathi

Crew
Director – Nalan Mendis
Producer– Sandya Mendis-Susila Productions
Scriptwriter – Somaweera Senanayake
Asst. Director – Udeni Alwis/ Roshan Dhananjaya/ Gamini Silva
Art Director – Kumara Dahanayake
Cameraman – Ayeshmantha Hettiarchchi
Music Director – Rohana Weerasinghe
Make-up Director – J Suranimala/ Rohan Mudannayake/ W. Jayatissa
Editor – Ravindra Guruge/ Sisira K Senaratne

References

Sri Lankan drama television series
Sri Lankan television shows
1990s Sri Lankan television series
1990 Sri Lankan television series debuts
1995 Sri Lankan television series endings
Sri Lanka Rupavahini Corporation original programming